The curling competition of the 2018 Winter Olympics was held between 8 and 25 February 2018 at the Gangneung Curling Centre. This was the seventh time that curling is on the Olympic program. In each of the men's and women's competitions, ten nations competed. A third competition was added for the 2018 Olympics, mixed doubles, in which teams consist of one woman and one man. There were eight participating countries in the doubles competition.

Qualification

Qualification to the curling tournaments at the Winter Olympics was determined through two methods. Nations could qualify teams by earning qualification points from performances at the 2016 and 2017 World Curling Championships. Teams could also qualify through an Olympic qualification event which was held in December 2017. Seven nations qualified teams via World Championship qualification points, while two nations qualified through the qualification event. As host nation, South Korea qualified teams automatically, thus making a total of ten teams per gender in the curling tournaments. For the mixed doubles competition the top seven ranked teams earning qualification points from performances at the 2016 and 2017 World Mixed Doubles Curling Championship qualified along with hosts South Korea.

Competition schedule
Curling competitions started the day before the Opening Ceremony and finish on the last day of the games, meaning the sport was the only one to have a competition every day of the games. The following was the competition schedule for the curling competitions:

Medal summary

Medal table

Medal events

Notes
  The Olympic Athletes from Russia team originally won the mixed doubles bronze medal, but were disqualified after Alexander Krushelnitskiy tested positive for meldonium.

Results summary

Men's tournament

Round robin
Standings

Results

Playoffs

Women's tournament

Round robin
Standings

Results

Playoffs

Mixed doubles

Round robin
Standings

Results

Playoffs

Participating nations
A total of 113 athletes from 13 nations (including the IOC's designation of Olympic Athletes from Russia) were scheduled to participate (the numbers of athletes are shown in parentheses). Some curlers competed in both the 4-person and mixed doubles tournament, therefore the numbers included on this list are the total athletes sent by each NOC to the Olympics, not how many athletes they qualified.

References

External links
 Official Results Book – Curling

 
2018
2018 in curling
International curling competitions hosted by South Korea
2018 Winter Olympics events